Chaem Luang is a tambon (subdistrict) of Galyani Vadhana District, in Chiang Mai Province, Thailand. In 2015 it had a population of 3,748 people.

History
The subdistrict was created effective 16 November 1995 by splitting off seven administrative villages from Ban Chan.

Administration

Central administration
The tambon is divided into seven administrative villages (mubans).

Local administration
The area of the subdistrict is covered by the subdistrict administrative organization (SAO) Chaem Luang (องค์การบริหารส่วนตำบลแจ่มหลวง).

References

External links
Thaitambon.com on Chaem Luang

Tambon of Chiang Mai province
Populated places in Chiang Mai province